The House of Gramont is the name of an old French noble family, whose name is connected to the castle of Gramont (Agramont in Spanish)    Basque province of Lower Navarre, France.

Notable members 

 Antoine III de Gramont (1604–1678), Military officer and diplomat, with the title Maréchal de France (1641).
Catherine-Charlotte de Gramont (1639–1678), princesse de Monaco and mistress of Louis XIV, daughter of the previous.
 Antoine V de Gramont (1671–1725), duc de Gramont (also named duc de Guiche), Maréchal de France (1724), grandson of the first.
 Louis of Gramont (1689–1745), defeated in the Battle of Dettingen and killed in the Battle of Fontenoy, son of Antoine V.
 Eugénie de Gramont (1788–1846), religious figure, granddaughter of Antoine Adrien, comte de Gramont (1726–1762).
 Antoine-Geneviève-Héraclius-Agénor de Gramont (1789–1854), duc de Gramont, court figure with close relations to the Bourbons, great-great-grandson of Antoine V.
 Agenor, duc de Gramont(1819–1880), duke of Gramont and prince of Bidache, French diplomat and statesman, son of the previous.
 Louis de Gramont (1854–1912), son of Ferdinand, French dramatist and librettist.
 Louis-René Alexandre de Gramont (1883–1963), comte de Gramont, son of Agénor de Gramont (1851–1925), Commandeur de la Légion d'honneur and Croix de guerre 1914–1918.
 Philipppe Agénor Marie Antoine de Gramont (1917–1940) son of  Louis-René de Gramont, comte de Gramont, Chevalier de la Légion d'honneur.
 Marguerite Corisande Alexandrine Marie de Gramont (1920–1998) baronne Philippe de Gunzbourg, daughter of comte de Gramont, Officier of Légion d'honneur and Croix de guerre.
 René Armand Antoine de Gramont (1927–2004) son of Louis-René de Gramont, comte de Gramont.
 François Marie Louis Antoine de Gramont (1931–1955) son of Louis-René de Gramont, comte de Gramont.
 Gabriel Antoine Armand, Comte de Gramont (1908–1943), a hero of the French Resistance, grandson of Agénor de Gramont (1819–1880) duc de Gramont and prince de Bidache.
 Sanche de Gramont (1932- ), son of the previous, gave up his titles and became a naturalized citizen of the United States under the name Ted Morgan.
 Arnaud François Louis Victurnien de Gramont (1960 - ) son of comte René de Gramont (1927–2004), photographer.
 Antoine Alfred Arnaud Xavier Louis de Gramont (1861–1923), French spectroscopist

See also 
Duc de Gramont

Bibliography 

 Jean de Jaurgain and Raymond Ritter, La maison de Gramont 1040-1967, Les amis du musée pyrénéen, Tarbes (two volumes) (in French)

References

External links 
The Gramont in the History of Navarre

Surnames

de:Herzöge von Gramont
eu:Agramondar leinua